The Queen's Award for Enterprise: International Trade (International Trade Export) (2013) was awarded in  2013, by Queen Elizabeth II.

The following organisations were awarded this year:

Recipients

 Alfred Cheyne Engineering 
 Armagard 
 Astro Lighting
 Auger Torque Europe 
 Benoy 
 BlueGnome 
 BMT Defence Services 
 Bon Bon Buddies
 Campbell Lutyens Holdings 
 CFC Underwriting 
 Charterhouse Property Management 
 CommAgility 
 Coombe Castle International 
 CRFS 
 DB Orthodontics 
 Denis Wick Products 
 Ealing Hammersmith & West London College 
 Easypack 
 EIP Partnership 
 Elekta
 Elmgrove Foods 
 EPTG 
 Espiner Medical 
 ETL Systems 
 Euroforest 
 Europlus Direct 
 Exploration Partners International 
 Fever-Tree
 FIRST Magazine
 Fort Vale Engineering
 G3Baxi Partnership
 Galmarley t/a BullionVault
 Gapuma (UK)
 Global Inkjet Systems
 Griffon Hoverwork
 Hewson Consulting Engineers
 Highclere International Investors
 HotDocs
 HRH
   I Love Cosmetics
   Imparta
   Inca Digital Printers
   Isoprime
   JoBird&Co
   Just Rollers
   Keltic Seafare (Scotland)
   KP Technology
   Limpsfield Combustion Engineering Co
   London & Scandinavian Metallurgical Co
   London School of Business & Finance (UK)
   McLaren Electronic Systems
   Mediplus
   Metal Events
   Metalube
   Metryx
   Mettler-Toledo Safeline X-ray
   ModuSpec Engineering UK
   MW High Tech Projects UK
   Nails Inc
   Nasco (UK)
   Niftylift
   Oil Consultants
   Omex Agrifluids
   Osborn Metals
   Palintest
   Panache Lingerie
   PCME
   Pearson Engineering
   Pentland Group
   Petroleum Experts
   Pipeshield International
   Plant Parts
   Projection Lighting
   Protec Technical
   Proto Labs
   RealVNC
   Regatta
   Reid Lifting
   Renewable Energy Systems Holdings
   Rigibore
   Rinicom
   Royal Society of Chemistry (RSC) Publishing
   Sarkar Defence Solutions
   Seers Medical
   SelectScience
   Shand Engineering
   Sheppee International
   Simpleware
   Smart Voucher t/a Ukash
   Soil Machine Dynamics
   Spencer Feeds
   Speymalt Whisky Distributors t/a Gordon & MacPhail
   SPTS Technologies UK
   SRK Consulting (UK)
   Steelite International
   Stirling Lloyd Polychem
   Structure-flex
   Sun Mark
   Symon Dacon
   TENMAT
   TestPlant
   The Cambridge Satchel Company
   The Innis & Gunn Brewing Company
   The University of Huddersfield (Business School)
   The Wakefield Shirt Company
   Thirty Nine Essex Street Chambers
   Tiffany Rose
   Totalpost Services
   Triveritas
   Tyrrells Potato Crisps
   W Durston
   Weir Minerals Europe
   Whetman Pinks
   Winn & Coales International
   Winsted
   Wood & Douglas
   Zinc Ahead

References

2013 awards in the United Kingdom
Queen's Award for Enterprise: International Trade (Export)